Ella Mai is the debut studio album by English singer and songwriter Ella Mai, released on 12 October 2018 through 10 Summers and Interscope Records. It includes the singles "Boo'd Up" and "Trip". It is executive-produced by DJ Mustard, and features guest appearances from Chris Brown, John Legend, and H.E.R.

"Boo'd Up" was originally included on Mai's 2017 EP Ready and reached number five on the US Billboard Hot 100 in July 2018. The follow-up single, "Trip", released in August 2018, has reached number 11. After her own headline tour of the United States, Mai appeared as a supporting act on dates of Bruno Mars' 24K Magic World Tour from 4 October leading up to the release of the album. The album debuted in the top 20 in the UK and at number five on the US Billboard 200. The album was nominated for Best R&B Album at the 62nd Annual Grammy Awards.

Background
In August 2018, DJ Mustard explained to Billboard that upon signing Mai, there was a plan to make three EPs and see if any of the songs caught enough public attention to make an album. Following the success of "Boo'd Up", DJ Mustard said: "So the plan worked. What people don't understand, this is like my little sister. This project coming is like my baby. I'm pressing for it more than my own shit. It's all about her right now."

Music
The album has been called a "throwback R&B record", with influences from trap and rap. Interviewed by Keryce Chelsi Henry of Forbes, Ella Mai talked about the creative process and musical arrangements for the album:"Mustard and I really wanted to make sure that the album was cohesive with the EPs, sound-wise, but also elevated; [...] I worked with a few other producers on the album to add more variety, but as executive producer, Mustard really worked hard with me to expand our sound and create something that we love and are extremely proud of. [...] During the recording process I really had to dig deep, challenge and push myself to the limits. I hope that listening to Ella Mai makes you feel the exact same way I felt when I was recording it."

Commercial performance
Ella Mai debuted at number 18 on the UK Albums Chart, becoming her first entry on that chart. It was certified gold by the BPI in August 2022.

In the United States, the album debuted at number 5 on the US Billboard 200, earning 69,000 album-equivalent units (including 17,000 were pure album sales) in its first week. This became Mai's highest entry on the chart. Less than two weeks later, the album was certified gold by the Recording Industry Association of America (RIAA) for combined sales and album-equivalent units of over 500,000 units in the United States. In March 2019, the album was then certified platinum by the Recording Industry Association of America (RIAA) for combined sales and album-equivalent units of over 1,000,000 units in the United States. As of October 2021, the album would go on to reach double platinum status for combined sales and album-equivalent units of over 2,000,000 units in the United States.

Track listing
Adapted from Tidal, Mai's Twitter, DJ Mustard's Instagram, ASCAP, and BMI.

Notes
  signifies a co-producer
  signifies an additional producer

Personnel
Credits adapted from Tidal.

Performance
 Ella Mai – main artist
 Chris Brown – featured artist 
 John Legend – featured artist 
 H.E.R. – featured artist 
 MUSYCA Children's Choir– vocals

Production
 Nana Rogues – production 
 Bryan-Michael Cox – production 
 DJ Mustard – production , co-production 
 Harmony Samuels – production 
 Kosine – production 
 Miykal Snoddy – production 
 Lido – production 
 Quintin Gulledge – additional production 
 J Holt – co-production 
 Rance – co-production 
 Andrew Groziuso – co-production 
 Dimi Sloane Sesson II – co-production 
 Giscard Friedman – co-production 
 Omer Fedi – co-production 
 Thomas Strahle – co-production

Instrumentation
 Marlon M. Williams – guitar

Technical
 Jaycen Joshua – mixing 
 Jacob Richards – mixing 
 Mike Seaberg – mixing 
 Rashawn McLean – mixing 
 Chris Athens – mastering

Charts

Weekly charts

Year-end charts

Certifications

References

2018 debut albums
Ella Mai albums
Albums produced by DJ Mustard
Interscope Records albums